Kevin Moran (born 13 September 1990 in Paisley) is a Scottish squash player. He has represented Scotland at the Commonwealth Games.

References

1990 births
Living people
Scottish male squash players